Chaparmukh is railway junction station under Northeast Frontier Railway of Lumding railway division located in Kachowa Gaon of Nagaon district in the state of Assam.

Major Trains
 New Delhi–Dibrugarh Rajdhani Express (Via New Tinsukia)
Silghat Town - Tambaram Nagaon Express
Dibrugarh-Lalgarh Avadh Assam Express
Dibrugarh-Howrah Kamrup Express via Guwahati
Agartala - Deoghar Weekly Express
Silghat Town - Kolkata Kaziranga Express
Dibrugarh–Amritsar Express
New Tinsukia–Rajendra Nagar Weekly Express
Alipurduar–Silghat Town Rajya Rani Express
Guwahati–Jorhat Town Jan Shatabdi Express
Guwahati–Silchar Express
Guwahati - Mariani BG Express
Alipurduar–Lumding Intercity Express
New Tinsukia - Darbhanga Jivachh Link Express
Guwahati–Ledo Intercity Express

References

External links

Railway junction stations in Assam
Railway stations in Nagaon district
Lumding railway division